Carraízo is a barrio in the municipality of Trujillo Alto, Puerto Rico. Its population in 2010 was 16,399.

History
Puerto Rico was ceded by Spain in the aftermath of the Spanish–American War under the terms of the Treaty of Paris of 1898 and became an unincorporated territory of the United States. In 1899, the United States Department of War conducted a census of Puerto Rico finding that the population of Carraízo barrio was 1,159.

Carraízo Dam and Loíza Lake
The Loíza Lake is a reservoir located in Carraizo, formed by the construction of the Carraízo Dam on the Río Grande de Loíza. It serves as the main water supply source of the San Juan metropolitan area.

Gallery

Popular culture
"Carraízo" is popularly used in Puerto Rican vernacular Spanish as a minced oath to substitute for "carajo" (a vulgar term equivalent to "hell" in Caribbean Spanish). The expression "anda pa'l Carraízo" and its variants is equivalent to "go to heck" or "buzz off" in English. It is considered mild enough to use in polite company. The expression has spread to the Dominican Republic, probably due to the close ties between the two islands.

See also

 List of communities in Puerto Rico

References

Barrios of Trujillo Alto, Puerto Rico